Nissim Calderon (1 April 1933 – 24 February 2020) was a Goodyear executive and scientist, noted for his introduction of olefin metathesis in 1967.  His work on olefin metathesis led to the 2005 Nobel Prize in Chemistry.

Education

 1958 – MS Chemistry from Hebrew University
 1962 – PhD in Polymer science from the University of Akron

Personal

Calderon was born in Jerusalem on 1 April 1933, the son of Jacob and Rina (Behar) Calderon. Calderon married Rivka Rapoport on July 26, 1961. They had two children.

Career

In 1962 Calderon joined Goodyear Tire and Rubber Company. 

In 1967 Calderon was promoted to Section Head of Elastomers Research Division. 

In 1983 Calderon became manager of tire materials research.

In 1998 Calderon retired as Vice President.  Dr. Calderon held this position as an officer of the company for twelve years until his retirement.  Under Calderon's stewardship, Goodyear entered into four major CRADA programs with Sandia National Laboratories, focused on the development of modeling tools for predicting composite performance.

Awards

 1994 – Carl-Dietrich Medal by DKG, the German Rubber Society
 2020 – Charles Goodyear Medal of the Rubber Division of the American Chemical Society. Because Calderon passed away before the award ceremony, the award was accepted on his behalf by longtime collaborator and friend Adel Halasa. During his remarks, Halasa – an Arab originally from Jordan – said of Calderon: "Jewish and Arab, harmoniously we worked together as friends forever. Only in America. Here's what happened. He said to me, 'I love this country.' I said to him, 'I love this country.' Because both of us can sit down and each lunch together. Only in America."

References

1933 births
2020 deaths
Polymer scientists and engineers
Jewish scientists
People from Jerusalem
Tire industry people
Goodyear Tire and Rubber Company people‎